The Sticks is the fourth album by Vancouver-based indie rock band Mother Mother released in Canada on September 18, 2012, and in the United States on February 12, 2013. It is a concept album that deals with the notions of isolation, escapism and withdrawal from modern society. It was produced by band member Ryan Guldemond and producer Ben Kaplan.

The album's first single, "Let's Fall in Love", was released on July 17, 2012.

Track listing
All songs written by Ryan Guldemond.

Personnel
Molly Guldemond - vocals and keyboard 
Ryan Guldemond - guitar and Main vocals 
Jasmin Parkin - keyboard and vocals 
Ali Siadat - drums 
Jeremy Page - bass

References

2012 albums
Albums recorded at Hipposonic Studios
Concept albums
Mother Mother albums